Variable lymphocyte receptors (VLRs) belong to the Leucine-rich repeat (LRR) family and mediate adaptive immune responses in the jawless vertebrates, lampreys and hagfish.

See also
 Adaptive immunity in jawless fish

References

Receptors
Agnatha